The 1957 Drake Bulldogs football team was an American football team that represented Drake University as an independent during the 1957 NCAA University Division football season. In its ninth season under head coach Warren Gaer, the team compiled a 7–2 record, lost to Louisville in the 1958 Sun Bowl, and outscored all opponents by a total of 185 to 112. The team played its home games at Drake Stadium in Des Moines, Iowa.

Schedule

References

Drake
Drake Bulldogs football seasons
Drake Bulldogs football